Zhaoyao, also known as The Legends, is a 2019 Chinese television series starring Bai Lu, Xu Kai, Dai Xu and Xiao Yan. It is based on the novel of the same name by Jiuliu Feixiang. It aired on Hunan TV from January 28 to April 3, 2019.

Synopsis
Lu Zhaoyao (Bai Lu) and her grandfather are bound by duty to guard the seal that has kept the Demon King's son in chains. When an intruder barges in, the Demon King's son escapes and falls into the hands of the righteous sect. Zhao Yao saves him (Xu Kai) and gives him the name Mo Qing. In trying to obtain the Wan Jun Sword, Zhao Yao mistakenly thinks that Mo Qing has betrayed her.

Five years later, Lu Zhaoyao manages to establish a connection with Qin Zhiyan (Xiao Yan) of the Immortal Sect. She returns to Wan Lu Sect, hoping to reclaim her position. She discovers that Mo Qing, the Demon King's son, has reclaimed his name as Li Chenlan and currently sits in the center of power. Lu Zhaoyao uses her attraction towards him and colludes with Jiang Wu (Dai Xu) with a scheme of her own. Secrets from the past are revealed. Lu Zhaoyao realizes who her friends and enemies are all along.

Cast
Bai Lu as Lu Zhaoyao
Xu Kai as Li Chenlan / Mo Qing
Dai Xu as Jiang Wu 
Xiao Yan as Qin Zhiyan
Liu Guanxiang as Luo Mingxuan
Mi Lu as Liu Suruo
Li Zifeng as Qin Qianxuan
Xiang Hao as Gu Hanguang 
Yang Ze as Liu Cangling
Ding Ye as Sima Rong
Zhang Xin as Lu Shiqi
Wang Deshun as Zi Dan

Production

Filming
Shooting began on October 27, 2017 at Hongshilinzhen in Hunan and wrapped up on February 12, 2018. Filming also took place in Hengdian World Studios.

Crew
Zheng Wei, the main director of the drama, previously directed The Imperial Doctress and Secret of the Three Kingdoms.
The production team also hired screenwriter Shunjian Qingcheng (The Rise of Phoenixes) as the literary consult of the drama; and Yuan Jie as the main executive producer.
Jiuliu Feixiang, the author of the original novel, co-wrote the script with Yang Ziqian (Prince of Lan Ling).

Soundtrack
Zhaoyao (招摇; Ostentatious) performed by Chen Chusheng & Hu Shasha
Lu Zhiyao (路之遥; A Far Journey) performed by Ding Ding
Ye Weiyang (未央夜; Night Hasn't Ended) performed by Yuan Ye
Su Ming (宿命; Fate) performed by Deng Gu
Yi Qi (一起; Together) performed by Ding Ding

Reception
The drama received positive reviews from the audience for its unique characters and comedic elements, as well as its interesting romance storyline. It was also praised for its showcase and emphasis on strong female characters, as well as its positive and inspirational storyline.
It topped television ratings in its time slot during its entire run.

Awards and nominations

References

External links
 

Hunan Television dramas
2019 Chinese television series debuts
2019 Chinese television series endings
Television shows based on Chinese novels
Xianxia television series